The Netherlands men's national volleyball team represents the Netherlands in FIVB tournaments. Volleyball is the most popular indoor sport in the country, with over 125,000 associates. The team had their most successful phase beginning in the 1990s under coaches Arie Selinger and Joop Alberda, reaching various finals for international tournaments and winning both the Olympic Games and the World League in 1996. Netherlands in World Championship won silver medal 1994 in Greece.

Results

Olympic Games

 Champions   Runners up   Third place   Fourth place

World Championship

FIVB World Cup

World Grand Champions Cup

European Championship

 1997 Netherlands —  Gold medal
 Peter Blangé, Albert Cristina, Robert van Es, Bas van de Goor, Mike van de Goor, Guido Görtzen, Jochem de Gruijter, Henk-Jan Held, Reinder Nummerdor

FIVB World League

Nations League

European League

Team

Current squad
The following is the Dutch roster in the 2022 World Championship.

Head coach:  Roberto Piazza

Coach history
  Benedykt Krysik
  Arie Selinger
  Joop Alberda
  Toon Gerbrands
  Bert Goedkoop
  Arie Cornelis Brokking
  Peter Blangé
  Edwin Benne
  Gido Vermeulen
  Roberto Piazza

Kit providers
The table below shows the history of kit providers for the Netherland national volleyball team.

Sponsorship
Primary sponsors include: main sponsors like Ilionx other sponsors: Lotto, Eilers Sport, Johan Cruyff Foundation, Zilveren Kruis, DELA. Voor Elkaar and BvdGF.

References

External links
Official website
FIVB profile

National men's volleyball teams
U
Men's sport in the Netherlands
Volleyball in the Netherlands